William Joseph "Dummy" Deegan (November 16, 1874 – May 17, 1957) was an American professional baseball pitcher. In 1901, he played in two games for New York Giants of Major League Baseball.

Deegan, nicknamed "Dummy" for being a deaf-mute, was one of three pitchers on the Giants staff in 1901 with that nickname; the other two being Dummy Leitner and Dummy Taylor.

External links 

1874 births
1957 deaths
Major League Baseball pitchers
New York Giants (NL) players
Jersey City Skeeters players
Deaf baseball players
Sportspeople from the Bronx
Baseball players from New York City
American deaf people
Meriden Silverites players
Burials at Saint Raymond's Cemetery (Bronx)
New Bedford Whalers (baseball) players